Kaija Parve-Helinurm (born 14 June 1964, in Tallinn) is a former and so far most successful Estonian biathlete. She used to be a cross-country skier (became Estonian champion in 1983), but after hearing that there was a possibility to participate in World Championships, Parve switched to biathlon. After spending 7 years with Soviet biathlon team, she retired in 1990 due to pregnancy and getting married. In 1992 Winter Olympics in Albertville, women's biathlon was held for the first time. The contestants, who won medals, had been beaten by Kaija with several minutes just few years earlier.

References

1964 births
Living people
Sportspeople from Tallinn
Estonian female biathletes
Biathlon World Championships medalists
Soviet female biathletes